The Hans Otto Theatre (German: Hans-Otto-Theater), named after the actor Hans Otto, is a municipal theatre in Potsdam in Germany. Its headquarters and main venue is in the Großes Haus am Tiefen See in Potsdam's cultural district on Schiffbauergasse. Other regular venues are the neighbouring historic Reithalle and occasionally the Palace Theatre in the Neues Palais.

History 

The Kingliches Schauspielhaus, dedicated to the pleasure of the inhabitants, was opened in 1795 under King Frederick William II of Prussia, successor to Frederick the Great, on the Potsdamer Stadtkanal. It was called the Canal Opera House in the vernacular because of this location. The house had room for 700 guests and initially functioned as a venue for the Schauspielhaus Berlin, had no ensemble of its own and was under the artistic direction of the Berlin general management. The programme included plays, operas and ballets – all of them guest performances from Berlin. Since the Potsdam garrison accounted for about a third of the population, military personnel made up a large part of the audience in addition to the middle-class audience. From 1846 onward, the theatre was run by private tenants and directors with their own ensembles. Plays and operas were shown, as well as comedy and much trivial entertainment. The business was on shaky ground; the theatre was temporarily closed several times. After the beginning of the First World War, the theatre switched to patriotic productions. After the German Revolution of 1918-1919, the state took over the theatre and in 1919 handed it over to a former officer, Kurt Pehlemann, as tenant, head of the theatre and actor. Pehlemann performed popular German classics, entertainment and German nationals. In 1924 the theatre was transformed into the Potsdamer Schauspielhaus GmbH; Pehlemann became artistic director. Shortly afterward, the theatre was renovated with public money and donations and reduced to 650 seats. For the reopening in 1929, Schiller's Kabale und Liebe was performed. After 1933, the repertoire was changed: In addition to little classical music, they played light fare and National Socialist drama. In 1945, the theatre burned down after heavy artillery fire during the Second World War, and in 1966 the ruins were blown up.

In 1946, the Brandenburg State Theatre was founded and initially found its venue in the baroque palace theatre of the Neues Palais. The opening production was Iphigenia on Tauris by Johann Wolfgang Goethe. A new temporary venue was opened on 16 October 1949 with Goethe's Faust, Part One in the former restaurant, society house and concert garden "Zum alten Fritz" in Zimmerstraße, which now houses the Science and Restoration Centre of the Schlösserstiftung.

In 1952, the theatre was named "Hans Otto Theatre" after the actor Hans Otto, who was arrested, tortured and murdered by the Nazis in November 1933 as a communist and trade unionist.

A reconstruction of Potsdam's city centre including a city hall and theatre decided in 1968 – the opening was planned for 1974 – was delayed. In 1985, another theatre building was planned; the building designed by Günter Franke, one of the architects of the Berlin TV Tower, was to be handed over in 1993 for Potsdam's 1000-year anniversary. The foundation stone was laid in 1989, before the fall of the Wall. However, the already completed shell at Art-Pro at Old Market Square was demolished in 1991 following a decision by the city council. In its place, the Landtag Brandenburg opened in January 2014 in historicised facades of the City Palace, Potsdam, which was damaged in World War II and demolished in 1960. The old venue in Zimmerstraße was closed at about the same time due to structural defects. Substitute venues were temporarily found in Schiffbauergasse and Heinrich-Mann-Allee. A temporary theatre building was erected at the Alter Markt, which was to serve as the central venue for five years and was soon nicknamed the "tin can" by the Potsdam public.

In 1998, a venue for children's and youth theatre was established on Schiffbauergasse (on Berliner Straße). In 1999, the decision was made to build the long-awaited new theatre building for the state capital of Potsdam on the newly developed cultural and commercial site Schiffbauergasse. In April 2003, the first sod was turned; in October 2003, the foundation stone was laid. To bridge the construction phase until the opening of the New Theatre, the then artistic director of the Hans-Otto-Theatre, Uwe Eric Laufenberg (2004-2009), invited his audience for two seasons under the motto "on the road" to various, sometimes exotic, alternative venues in the city. exotic alternative venues in the city, such as the Orangery Palace in Park Sanssouci, the pavilion on Freundschaftsinsel, the Palais Lichtenau or the Französische Kirche. Plays also continued in the "Blechbüchse" – it was the main venue of the Hans Otto Theater GmbH for fourteen years until its final closure in June 2006. On the weekend of 22 to 24 September 2006, two years after the topping-out ceremony in September 2004, the new building of the Hans Otto Theater GmbH, the New Theatre, was ceremoniously opened.

Brief summary of the history of the theatre since 1946:
 from 1946 "Landestheater der Mark Brandenburg" in the Neues Palais
 from 1947 "Brandenburg State Theatre
 from October 1949 in the former restaurant, society house and concert garden "Zum alten Fritz" in Zimmerstraße
 from October 1952 "Hans-Otto-Theatre
 1953 connection of the touring theatre "Landesbühne Brandenburg" as a touring ensemble to the Hans-Otto-Theatre
 1991 to 2006 in the provisional theatre building at the Old Market ("Blechbüchse")
 1993 transformation of the "Hans-Otto-Theater" into "Hans Otto Theater GmbH" (and "Brandenburgische Philharmonie Potsdam GmbH"; dissolved in 2000)
 since September 2006 in the New Theatre on Schiffbauergasse
 since the 2018–2019 season the New Theatre is called Großes Haus

Artistic directors since 1946:
 Fritz Kirchhoff (1946–1947)
 Rochus Gliese (1947–1948)
 Alfred Dreifuß (1948 until 1950)
 Ilse Rodenberg (1951 until 1957)
 Gerhard Meyer (1957 until 1968)
 Peter Kupke (1968 until 1971)
 Gero Hammer (1971 until 1991)
 Guido Huonder (1991 until 1993)
 Stephan Märki (1993 until 1997)
 Ralf-Günter Krolkiewicz (1997 until 2004)
 Uwe Eric Laufenberg (2004 until 2009)
 Tobias Wellemeyer (2009 until 2018)
 Bettina Jahnke (since 2018)

Theatre organisation 
The Hans Otto Theatre is run in the legal form of a Gesellschaft mit beschränkter Haftung (GmbH).

Intendance 
Bettina Jahnke, born in Wismar, studied at what is now the University of Music and Theatre Leipzig Theatre Studies. She produced her first productions at the former "Poetisches Theater" of the University of Leipzig before moving to the Staatstheater Cottbus as assistant director and director in 1994. (artistic director: Christoph Schroth). Between 1998 and 2007, she worked as a freelance director at various theatres in Germany and Switzerland (including Theater Magdeburg, Schauspiel Leipzig, Volkstheater Rostock, Potsdam, Esslingen, Bern), was a lecturer at the Felix Mendelssohn Bartholdy Academy of Music and Theatre and, from 2005, was head director at the Staatstheater Cottbus (artistic director: Martin Schüler). In 2009, she took over the directorship of the Rheinisches Landestheater Neuss, which she led to national attention with her high artistic standards. Under her direction, several productions were invited to the NRW Theatertreffen and also won awards. Bettina Jahnke has been the artistic director of the Hans Otto Theatre since the 2018–2019 season.

Acting Ensemble 
The theatre's ensemble consists of 25 committed actors. Since autumn 2018, under the artistic direction of Bettina Jahnke, more female directors have been working at the Hans Otto Theater, with the artistic direction placing great value on parity. Guest directors since then have been or are: Frank Abt, Jörg Bitterich, Marc Becker, Nicole Erbe, Kathrin Filler, Manuela Gerlach, Esther Hattenbach, Sascha Hawemann, Mario Holetzeck, Anna Franziska Huber, Bettina Jahnke, Jan Jochymski, Malte Kreuzfeldt, Steffi Kühnert, Konstanze Lauterbach Bernd Mottl, Ulrike Müller, Milena Paulovics, Nina de la Parra, Moritz Peters, Katrin Plötner, Mike Priebe, Annette Pullen, Tobias Johannes Erasmus Rott, Katharina Schmitt, Petra Schönwald, Caro Thum, Alexandra Wilke, Sebastian Wirnitzer, Angelika Zacek.

Repertoire 
The repertoire of the Hans-Otto-Theatre includes drama as well as theatre for children and young people. Together with the Kammerakademie Potsdam, the Hans Otto Theatre produces the annual new production of the Potsdam Winter Opera. Within the theatre and concert association of the state of Brandenburg, the Hans Otto Theatre presents its performances in the cities of Frankfurt (Oder) (Kleist Forum) and Brandenburg an der Havel (Brandenburg Theatre). Musical theatre productions from the Staatstheater Cottbus come to the Hans-Otto-Theater for guest performances.

Venues 
The main venues on Schiffbauergasse are the Großes Haus, a new stage building opened in 2006 with 485 seats, and the nearby Reithalle with 162 seats. In addition, there is the smaller stage Reithalle Box and the open-air summer stage at the Tiefen See.

Großes Haus  

The parent building and main venue of the Hans Otto Theatre was built from 2003 to 2006 on the cultural and commercial site Schiffbauergasse (house number 11). The clients of the 26.5 million euro project were the city of Potsdam and the Brandenburg State Development Corporation. The documentary film by Klaus Wunder Theater ohne Ende zum glücklichen Ende – Theaterbau in Potsdam shows the eventful struggle for a new theatre from 1988 to 2006.

Architecture 

The architect Paul Böhm, son of Gottfried Böhm, designed and realised together with his father a five-storey theatre building with shell-shaped, cantilevered roofs. Concrete, glass and steel are the predominant materials. A listed gas holder was integrated into the structure. On the Tiefen See side, a former chicory mill, also a listed building, adjoins the theatre structure; it now houses a restaurant.

The upper foyer and stage hall have glass window fronts that look out over the Havel River to Park Babelsberg. The hall can be completely darkened for evening theatre performances. The hall has room for a maximum of 485 spectators. There are 50 lifting platforms under the rows of spectators, with which the auditorium can be flexibly lowered and raised. The backstage can be opened to the rounded interior of the Gasometer. An orchestra pit also makes the stage suitable for musical theatre performances.

The new Hans Otto Theatre was officially opened on 22 September 2006. At a ceremony attended by Federal President Horst Köhler and Brandenburg's Prime Minister Matthias Platzeck, the cultural and economic importance of the new theatre location for the city of Potsdam was acknowledged and reference was made to the hoped-for signal effect for the new federal states. The opening received widespread media coverage throughout Germany. On the weekend of 22 to 24 September, five premieres were on the programme, including two world premieres, a German-language premiere and Lessing's Nathan the Wise.
In the 2015 film documentary Die Böhms - Architektur einer Familie by Maurizius Staerkle-Drux, the new building of the New Theatre occupies an important place.

Reithalle 
The Reithalle is located at Potsdamer Schiffbauergasse 16, a two-minute walk from the Main House.

In the Reithalle A mainly productions of children's and youth theatre are performed. The Reithalle B is especially used for theatre rehearsals.

Palace Theatre in the New Palace 

The Palace Theatre is located directly in the New Palace at Am Neuen Palais 1 on the western edge of Park Sanssouci.

Awards 
 2008:  for the world premiere production of Staats-Sicherheiten under the direction of Clemens Bechtel

References

External links 

 
 Frederik Hanssen: Theater findet Stadt. In Der Tagesspiegel, 6 July 2014
 Dirk Becker: In der Familie beginnt die Welt. In Potsdamer Neueste Nachrichten, 23 May 2014
 Dirk Becker: Entwickeln, ohne uns zu verlieren. In Potsdamer Neueste Nachrichten, 29 May 2013
 Denis Newiak: Räume zum Träumen sind ein Lebensmittel. In Studierendenzeitschrift speakUP, 18 October 2012
 Frederik Hanssen: Provinztheater ist anderswo. In Der Tagesspiegel, 6 November 2007
 Frederik Hanssen: Und bist du nicht willig. In Der Tagesspiegel, 27 November 1996

Buildings and structures in Potsdam
Theatre in Germany